The Glastonbury Division is a former local government area in the Wide Bay–Burnett area of Queensland, Australia. Its headquarters were located in the town of Gympie.

History
The Glastonbury Division was one of the original divisions incorporated on 11 November 1879 under the Divisional Boards Act 1879 with a population of 714.

On 4 January 1895, Glastonbury Division was abolished and split between the Widgee Division and the Borough of Gympie.

Chairmen
 1880: Mr Hickson

References

Former local government areas of Queensland
1895 disestablishments in Australia
1879 establishments in Australia